Robert J. Franco is a set decorator. He was nominated for an Academy Award in the category Best Art Direction for the film The Age of Innocence.

Selected filmography
 The Age of Innocence (1993)

References

External links

Year of birth missing (living people)
Living people
Set decorators
Emmy Award winners